Paulus Castrensis was an Italian jurist of the 14th century.

Life
He studied under Baldus de Ubaldis at Perugia, and was a fellow-pupil with Cardinal de Zabarella. He was admitted to the degree of doctor of civil law in the University of Avignon, but it is uncertain when he first undertook the duties of a professor. A tradition, which has been handed down by Panzirolus, represents him as having taught law for a period of fifty-seven years. He was professor at Siena in 1390, at Avignon in 1394, and at Padua in 1429; and, at different periods, at Florence, at Bologna and at Perugia. He was for some time the vicar-general of Cardinal Zabarella at Florence, and his eminence as a teacher of Canon law may be inferred from the appraisal of one of his pupils, who styles him famosissirnus juris utriusque monarca.

His most complete treatise is his readings on the Digest, and it appears from a passage in his readings on the Digestum Vetus that he delivered them at a time when he had been actively engaged for forty-five years as a teacher of civil law. His death is generally assigned to 1436, but it appears from an entry in a manuscript of the Digestum Vetus, which is extant at Munich, made by the hand of one of his pupils who styles him præceptor meus, that he died on 20 July 1441.

Works 

 (posthumous work)
 
 
 
  (posthumous work)
  (posthumous work)
  (posthumous work)
  (posthumous work)
 
  (posthumous work)
  (posthumous work)
  (posthumous work)
  (posthumous work)
  (posthumous work)
  (posthumous work)
  (posthumous work)
  (posthumous work)
  (posthumous work)
  (posthumous work)
 
  (complete posthumous work)

References

Attribution:

Canon law jurists
University of Perugia alumni
University of Avignon alumni
Academic staff of the University of Siena
Academic staff of the University of Padua
Academic staff of the University of Florence
Academic staff of the University of Bologna
Academic staff of the University of Perugia
14th-century Italian jurists
15th-century Italian jurists
1441 deaths
Year of birth unknown